Donja Drežnica is a village in the City of Mostar, Bosnia and Herzegovina.

Demographics 
According to the 2013 census, its population was 717.

See also

 Gornja Drežnica

References

Populated places in Mostar
Villages in the Federation of Bosnia and Herzegovina